This is a list of the 99 members of the European Parliament for Germany in the 1999 to 2004 session.

List

Party representation (at the end of the session)

Notes

Germany
List
1999